The Group Therapy Tour was concert tour from American rock band Hootie & the Blowfish. It began on May 30, 2019, in Virginia Beach, Virginia, and ended on October 16, 2019, in Birmingham, England. This was their first full tour in over a decade, and was in support of their sixth studio album Imperfect Circle (2019).

As of July 6, 2019, the tour had proven to be the band's most successful, grossing $10.9 million.

Background
In December 2018, Hootie & the Blowfish appeared on The Today Show to announce a new album and tour. In April 2019, UK and Ireland shows were added.

Critical reception
Melissa Ruggieri of The Atlanta Journal-Constitution said, "If you loved their perfectly pleasant bar tunes back then, you'll appreciate that this is a well-produced nostalgic romp featuring a setlist stacked with singalongs, an effective stage show (sharp lighting, major video screen action) and a band that sounds record perfect." Billboard positively reviewed the band's performance in Nashville, praising Sonefeld's drumming, their cover of "Losing My Religion", the fusion of country and rock, and pairing with Barenaked Ladies. Mikael Wood of The Los Angeles Times gave the band's Troubador show a positive review and praised both their musicianship and how happy they made the crowd.

Opening act
Barenaked Ladies
 Jocelyn

Setlist
This setlist is representative of the May 31, 2019, concert in Raleigh, NC. It does not represent all concerts for the duration of the tour.
"Hannah Jane"
"State Your Peace"
"I Go Blind"
"Fine Line"
"Not Even the Trees"
"Hold My Hand"
"Losing My Religion" (R.E.M. cover)
"I Will Wait"
"Let Her Cry"
"Hey, Hey, What Can I Do" (Led Zeppelin cover)
"Will the Circle Be Unbroken"
"Desert Mountain Showdown"
"I Hope I Don't Fall In Love with You" (Tom Waits cover)
"Alright" (Darius Rucker Song)
"Running from an Angel"
"Drowning"
"Time"
"Wagon Wheel" (Old Crow Medicine Show cover; Darius Rucker version)
"Old Man and Me (When I Get to Heaven)"/"Fight the Power"/"Freaks of the Industry"/"Shining Star" (a medley including originals and covers)
Encore
"Goodbye"
"Go and Tell Him (Soup Song)"
"Only Wanna Be with You"/"Get Down on It"

Notes
In Columbia, MD, Noblesville, IN, St. Paul MN, Pelham, AL, Nashville TN, and Columbia, SC they performed "With a Little Help from My Friends" with Barenaked Ladies.

Tour dates

They additionally performed at The Troubador in Los Angeles on November 4, 2019.

List of fairs

Box office score data

References

External links

Hootie & the Blowfish tour homepage

2019 concert tours
Hootie & the Blowfish concert tours